Bistensee is a former municipality in the district of Rendsburg-Eckernförde, in Schleswig-Holstein, Germany. On 1 March 2008, it was merged with Ahlefeld to form the municipality Ahlefeld-Bistensee.

Villages in Schleswig-Holstein
Former municipalities in Schleswig-Holstein